The Auricular Chronicles is a live performance DVD by the Belgium-based death metal band Aborted. It contains the band's live performances including a full concert from May 2006 in Paris. It was released in October 2006 by Listenable Records.

Background
The main feature of the DVD consists of the live performance recorded on May 28 at La Locomotive in Paris. Bonus footage includes the band's performances at the Wacken Open Air 2006; Domination Tour 2006, Rome; North American Tour 2005, Montreal and music videos for the songs "Dead Wreckoning", "Meticulous Invagination" and "A Cold Logistic Slaughter".

The DVD was released by Metal Mind Productions on October 30, 2006.

Track listing

Live At Locomotive, Paris
 Dead Wreckoning
 Meticulous Invagination
 Gestated Rabidity
 The Holocaust Incarnate
 The Inertia
 Interlude
 The Saw and the Carnage Done
 Sanguine Verses (...Of Extirpation)
 Threading the Prelude
 The Gangrenous Epitaph
 Hecatomb
 The Sanctification of Fornication
 Charted Carnal Effigy
 A Cold Logistic Slaughter

Music videos
 Dead Wreckoning
 Meticulous Invagination
 A Cold Logistic Slaughter

Wacken Open Air 2006
  The Inertia
 Sanguine Verses
 Threading The Gangrenous Epitaph
 A Cold Logistic Slaughter

Domination Tour 2006, Rome
 Meticulous Invagination
 Gestated Rabidity
 The Sanctification Of Fornication

North American Tour 2005, Montreal
 Charted Carnal Effigy
 The Gangrenous Epitaph

+Documentary

References

External links
 

Aborted (band) albums
2006 concerts
Live video albums
2006 live albums
2006 video albums